Arhythmacanthidae is a family of parasitic worms from the order Echinorhynchida.

Species
There are 9 genera in the family Arhythmacanthidae which contains the following species:

Acanthocephaloides Meyer, 1932
Acanthocephaloides claviformis Araki & Machida, 1987

Found off Japan. The proboscis has 14 rows each of 6 hooks and 2 spines and the trunk has an anterior swelling. The apical hooks are the smallest; posterior hook largest, reaching up to 74 um. Hook and spine roots (when present) invariably simple, posteriorly directed, without manubria. Trunk spines are markedly smaller, with a variable distribution of trunk spines only on the anterior side.

Acanthocephaloides cyrusi Bray, Spencer-Jones & Lewis, 1988
A. cyrusi has been found parasitizing the fish: Blackhand sole (Pegusa nasuta referred to by its synonym Solea bleekeri) and the Small-spotted grunter (Pomadasys commersonnii) in Lake St. Lucia, Natal, South Africa. It is distinguished from the other species in the genus Arhythmacanthidae by the more greater sexual dimorphism in length, differing arrangement of hooks, the proboscis with the longest hooks at the anterior-most part and the larger size of proboscis hooks and body spines. Specifically, the proboscis hook rows with 3 spines and 3 hooks that increase in size anteriorly. Apical hook reaches 83–101 or 118–137 um in length and has root with large, oblique, anterior manubrium. Posterior spines rootless. Whole trunk with regular transverse rows of uniform, acuminate, 13–22 um long spines.
Acanthocephaloides delamuri (Parukhin, 1989) Amin, 2013
Acanthocephaloides distinctus Golvan, 1969
Found off Senegal.
Acanthocephaloides geneticus (Buron, Renaud & Euzet, 1985)
Found off the Mediterranean coast of France.
Acanthocephaloides ichiharai Araki & Machida, 1987
Found off Japan. The proboscis has variable 13–14 (rarely 12 or 16) hook rows of 10–12 hooks/spines (9 hooks and 3 rootless spines in 1 specimen). Hook and spine roots (when present) invariably simple, posteriorly directed, without manubria with the apical hook being the smallest; posterior hook largest, and reaching up to 74 um. The trunk is cylindrical and has spines only on the anterior portion smaller than probiscus hooks and variable in their distribution.

Acanthocephaloides irregularis Amin, Oğuz, Heckman, Tepe & Kvach, 2011
A. irregularis is found parasitizing the Combtooth blenny (Parablennius zvonimiri) in the Gulf of Odessa, Ukraine, the Mushroom goby (Ponticola eurycephalus) in the Sukhyi Estuary, in the Black Sea, and the Tubenose goby (Proterorhinus marmoratus) and Black-striped pipefish (Syngnathus abaster) in both locations. The species is named for its irregular distribution of trunk spines. A. irregularis is most similar to its closest relative, A. propinquus in proboscis shape and armature as both have 12 longitudinal rows of 5 hooks each and the shape of the trunk, reproductive system and lemnisci. A. irregularis differs from A. propinquus in having randomly distributed trunk spines that are organised in circular rings of individual spines separated by aspinose zones. A. irregularis is also unique in having an anterior trunk collar, a very large triangular cephalic ganglion, nucleated pouches at the posterior end of the proboscis receptacle, and hooks and spines with roots bearing anterior manubria. It is the tenth species of the genus to be described.
Acanthocephaloides neobythitis (Yamaguti, 1939) Amin, 2013
Found off Japan.
Acanthocephaloides nicoli (Kumar, 1992) Amin, 2013
Acanthocephaloides plagiusae Santana-Pineros, Cruz-Quintana, Centeno-Chale & Vidal-Martinez, 2013
Acanthocephaloides propinquus (Dujardin, 1845)

A. propinquus was found parasitizing Uranoscopus scaber, Gobius niger, Gobius cobitis, Merluccius merluccius, Scorpaena scrofa, Eutrigla gurnardus, and Solea vulgaris  in the bay of Gemlik, Turkey. It is also found in the Atlantic Ocean, Mediterranean Sea and Black Sea. The body is between 2600 and 6237 µm long and between 140 and 280 µm wide. The eggs were between 30 and 64 µm long and 10 to 16 µm wide.

Acanthocephaloides rhinoplagusiae (Yamaguti, 1935) Amin, 2013
Found off Japan.
Acanthocephaloides spinicaudatus (Cable & Quick, 1954) Pichelin & Cribb, 1999
Found off Puerto Rico.

Bolborhynchoides Achmerov and Dombrovskaja-Achmerova, 1959
Bolborhynchoides exiguus (Achmerow & Dombrowskaja-Achmerova, 1941)
Breizacanthus Golvan, 1969
Breizacanthus aznari Hernández-Orts, Alama-Bermejo, Crespo, García, Raga & Montero, 2012
Breizacanthus chabaudi Golvan, 1969
Breizacanthus golvani Gaevskaja & Shukhgalter, 1984
Breizacanthus irenae Golvan, 1969
Breizacanthus ligur Paggi, Orecchia & Della Setta, 1975
Euzetacanthus Golvan and Houin, 1964
Euzetacanthus chorinemusi Gupta & Naqvi, 1984
Euzetacanthus golvani Gupta & Fatma, 1985
Euzetacanthus simplex (Rudolphi, 1810)
Heterosentis Van Cleave, 1931
Heterosentis brasiliensis Vieira, Felizardo & Luque, 2009
Heterosentis fusiformis (Yamaguti, 1935) Tripathi, 1959
Heterosentis heteracanthus (Linstow, 1896) Van Cleave, 1931

H. heteracanthus was found parasitizing Patagonotothen longipes, Patagonotothen tessellata and Champsocephalus esox in the eastern mouth of the Beagle Channel.

Heterosentis hirsutus Pichelin & Cribb, 1999
Heterosentis holospinus Amin, Heckman & Ha, 2011

H. holospinus has been found parasitizing the Striped eel catfish (Plotosus lineatus), in Halong Bay, Vietnam.

 Heterosentis martini Lanfranchi & Timi, 2011
 Heterosentis mongcai Amin, Heckmann & Ha, 2014
 Heterosentis mysturi Wei, Huang, Chen and Jiang, 2002
 Heterosentis overstreeti (Schmidt & Paperna, 1978) Amin, 1985
 Heterosentis paraplagusiarum (Nickol, 1972) Amin, 1985
 Heterosentis plotosi (Yamaguti, 1935) Schmidt & Paperna, 1978
 Heterosentis septacanthus (Sita in Golvan, 1969) Amin, 1985
 Heterosentis thapari (Gupta & Fatma, 1979) Amin, 1985
 Heterosentis zdzitowieckii (Kumar, 1992) Pichelin & Cribb, 1999
Hypoechinorhynchus Yamaguti, 1939	
 Hypoechinorhynchus alaeopis Yamaguti, 1939
 Hypoechinorhynchus golvani Gutpa & Kumar, 1987
 Hypoechinorhynchus magellanicus Szidat, 1950

H. magellanicus was found parasitizing Champsocephalus esox in the eastern mouth of the Beagle Channel.

 Hypoechinorhynchus robustus Pichelin, 1999
 Hypoechinorhynchus thermaceri Buron, 1988
Paracanthocephaloides Golvan, 1969
Worms in this genus have no trunk spines.
 Paracanthocephaloides caballeroi (Gupta & Fatma, 1983) Bhattacharya, 2007
 Paracanthocephaloides chabanaudi (Dollfus, 1951)
 Paracanthocephaloides incrassatus (Molin, 1858) Meyer, 1932
 Paracanthocephaloides tripathii Golvan, 1969
Solearhynchus de Buron and Maillard, 1985

The proboscis hooks gradually decrease in size posteriorly.

 Solearhynchus kostylewi (Meyer, 1932)
S. kostylewi was found parasitizing Solea vulgaris  in the bay of Gemlik, Turkey. The body was between 7404 and 7854 µm long and 739 and 1040 µm wide. The
anterior part of the body was wider than the posterior. The proboscis was cylindrical and armed with 16 rows of hooks each with 5 or 6 hooks the longest hooks being in the middle of the proboscis. The smallest basal spinelike hooks were unrooted. The testes were located centrally in the body distant from the six cement glands. The eggs measured between 42 – 64µm long and between 12 and 20µm wide.

 Solearhynchus soleae (Porta, 1905)

S. soleae was found parasitizing Solea vulgaris  in the bay of Gemlik, Turkey. The body was from 5382 to 20328 µm long and 693 to 1200 µm wide. The proboscis was from 224 – 320 µm long and the proboscis sac was between 277 and 480 µm long. The proboscis has 12 – 14 rows of hooks each comprising 5 or 6 hooks. The longest hooks were in the middle of the proboscis and the smallest basal hooks were unrooted and resembled spines. The lemnisci were longer than the proboscis sac, measuring between 312 and 350 µm and between 312 – 349 µm long. Males had two testes in the posterior part of the body distant from six piriform cement glands. The eggs measured between 56 and 68 µm long and between 12 and 20 µm wide. This species was also recorded in the Black Sea by Belofastova and Korniychuk  (as the synonym Acanthocephaloides rhytidotes). The species name soleae derives from the genus name of the host, the Adriatic sole (Originannly named Solea impar, now named Pegusa impar).

Spiracanthus Muñoz and George-Nascimento, 2002
 Spiracanthus bovichthys Munoz & George-Nascimento, 2002

Hosts
Arhythmacanthidae  species parasitize fish.

Notes

References

Echinorhynchida
Acanthocephala families